Xyridacma is a genus of moths in the family Geometridae erected by Edward Meyrick in 1888.

Species
Xyridacma alectoraria Walker, 1860
Xyridacma ustaria Walker, [1863]
Xyridacma veronicae Prout, 1934

References

Oenochrominae